Ivo H. Daalder (born March 2, 1960 in The Hague, Netherlands), is President of the Chicago Council on Global Affairs and has served since July, 2013. He was the U.S. Permanent Representative on the Council of the North Atlantic Treaty Organization (NATO) from May 2009 to July 2013. He is a specialist in European security. He was a member of the staff of United States National Security Council (NSC) during the administration of President Bill Clinton, and was one of the foreign policy advisers to President Barack Obama during his 2008 presidential campaign.

Education and academic career

Daalder was educated at the University of Kent, Oxford University, and Georgetown University, and received his Ph.D. in political science from the Massachusetts Institute of Technology.

He was fellow at Harvard University's Center for Science and International Affairs and the International Institute for Strategic Studies in London. He received a Pew Faculty Fellowship in International Affairs and an International Affairs Fellowship of the Council on Foreign Relations. Daalder was an associate professor at the University of Maryland's School of Public Affairs, where he was also director of research at the Center for International and Security Studies. He was a Senior Fellow in foreign policy studies at the Brookings Institution from 1997 to 2009, where he was a specialist in European security, transatlantic relations, and national security affairs.

National Security Council and Hart-Rudman Commission

In 1995–1997, Daalder served as a director for European Affairs on the National Security Council staff under President Bill Clinton, where he was responsible for coordinating U.S. policy toward Bosnia. From 1998–2001, Daalder served as a member of the Study Group of the U.S. Commission on National Security/21st Century (the Hart-Rudman Commission), a multi-year examination of U.S. national security requirements and institutions.

Permanent Representative to NATO
On March 11, 2009, President Obama nominated Daalder to become the United States Permanent Representative to NATO, a post commonly referred to as "U.S. Ambassador to NATO".

One of the issues that Daalder has addressed is the lack of communication on security issues between NATO and the European Union. In October 2010 he wrote in the International Herald Tribune: "NATO and E.U. capabilities need to be in synch, and their operations need to be complementary. We should regularly engage in a robust and transparent exchange of views on a wide range of shared interests. Policy should support work in the field; those in harm's way shouldn't have to work around our failures in Brussels."

NATO intervention in Libya

Daalder was U.S. Permanent Representative to NATO in February 2011 when the Libyan Civil War began with uprisings against Muammar Gaddafi in several cities, followed by a military crackdown by the Gaddafi regime. On March 17, 2011, the United Nations Security Council passed a resolution calling upon the international community to take "all necessary measures" to protect civilians in Libya. On March 19, following UN authorization, the United States led a coalition of allied countries, including Belgium, Canada, Denmark, France, Italy, the Netherlands, Norway, Spain, and the United Kingdom, launching air strikes against Gaddafi's forces, destroying his air defense system and imposing a no-fly zone and a naval blockade to prevent shipments of arms.

Daalder then led U.S. efforts to persuade NATO to take over command and control of the operation. On March 27, the North Atlantic Council voted unanimously to take charge of what became known as Operation Unified Protector. The Operation had three missions; to police the arms embargo, to patrol the no-fly zone, and to protect civilians. Fourteen NATO allies took part in the actual operations, along with contingents from Jordan, Morocco, Qatar, and the United Arab Emirates. In Libya, unlike other military intervention in Kosovo, Iraq and Afghanistan, the United States played a largely supporting role, providing intelligence, aerial surveillance and refueling, while other NATO allies, including France, the United Kingdom, Denmark and Belgium, flew most of the bombing missions.

The first two missions were quickly put into place, but, due to the presence of Gaddafi forces in or near civilian areas, NATO was unable to strike with full force. By August 2011, however, the opposition forces were strong enough to seize Tripoli and within two months had taken control of the entire country. On October 23, 2011–233 days after Operation Unified Protector had begun—the NATO North Atlantic Council declared its mission complete.

In February 2012, Daalder and Admiral James Stavridis, the Supreme Allied Commander in Europe, wrote about the operation in Foreign Affairs: "NATO's operation in Libya has rightly been hailed as a model intervention. The alliance responded rapidly to a deteriorating situation that threatened hundreds of thousands of civilians rebelling against an oppressive regime. It succeeded in protecting those civilians and, ultimately, in providing the time and space for local forces to overthrow Muammar Gaddafi. And it did so by involving partners in the region and sharing the burden among the alliance's partners".

Chicago Council on Global Affairs

In July 2013, Daalder became President of the Chicago Council on Global Affairs – an independent, nonpartisan think tank that convenes leading global voices, conducts independent research, and engages the public to provide insights and influence the public discourse on critical global issues. Under Daalder, the Council has extended the reach and relevance of its global work by increasing its roster of experts and portfolio of issues; extending the Council's historic platform for global leaders to engage the public; building a global audience by connecting through digital and social media channels; revitalizing the Council's brand; and growing its financial, foundation, and membership support. Daalder also conceived and spearheaded the 2015 Chicago Forum on Global Cities, a now annual conference in partnership with the Financial Times that convenes leaders and delegates from around the world for a cross-sector exploration of the influence and impact of global cities in shaping the world's future. Following this rapid growth, the Council was ranked the top "Think Tank to Watch" by the University of Pennsylvania's 2015 Global Go To Think Tank Index.

Bibliography

Books
 The Empty Throne: America's Abdication of Global Leadership (PublicAffairs (October, 2018)) 
 In the Shadow of the Oval Office: Portraits of the National Security Advisers and the Presidents they Serve—From JFK to George W. Bush, with I.M. Destler. (Simon & Schuster, 2009).  
 Beyond Preemption: Force and Legitimacy in a Changing World (edited, 2007).  
 The Crescent of Crisis: U.S.-European Strategy for the Greater Middle East, co-edited with Nicole Gnesotto and Phil Gordon (2006).  
 America Unbound: The Bush Revolution in Foreign Policy, with James M. Lindsay (2003). Winner of 2003 Lionel Gelber Prize. Revised and updated edition published by John Wiley & Sons in 2005. Translated into Chinese, Dutch, Korean, Italian and Polish.  
 Protecting the American Homeland: One Year on, with Michael E. O'Hanlon (editor), I. M. Destler, David L. Gunter, Robert Litan, Peter Orszag, and James Steinberg (2003).
 Protecting the American Homeland: A Preliminary Analysis, with Michael E. O'Hanlon (editor), I. M. Destler, David L. Gunter, Robert Litan, Peter Orszag, and James Steinberg (2002).
 Winning Ugly: NATO's War to Save Kosovo, with Michael E. O'Hanlon (2000).  
 Getting to Dayton: The Making of America's Bosnia Policy (2000).

Newspaper articles

 "America's new global challenge", with Anne-Marie Slaughter Boston Globe, July 24, 2008.
 "Talking to Iran Is Our Best Option", with Philip Gordon The Washington Post, June 29, 2008.
 "The United Nations Can Save Burma", with Paul Stares International Herald Tribune and Boston Globe, May 13, 2008.
 "NATO: A Mockery of Enlargement", with James Goldgeier, International Herald Tribune, April 8, 2008.
 "Presidential Politics Can Help Iraq Policy", with Philip Gordon, Boston Globe, March 29, 2008.
  "Iraq After the Surge" NRC Handelsblad, December 8, 2007.
 "A Nuclear-Free World", with John Holum, Boston Globe, October 5, 2007.
 "Nuclear Weapons in the Age of al-Qaeda", with Jeffrey Lewis, Financial Times, August 13, 2007.
 "The Next Intervention: Legitimacy Matters", with Robert Kagan, The Washington Post, August 6, 2007.
 "U.S. and Europe Must Learn About Alliances", with James Goldgeier, Financial Times, December 14, 2006.
 "Global Challenges for NATO", with James Goldgeier, El País, November 27, 2006.
 "NATO: For Global Security, Expand the Alliance", with James Goldgeier, International Herald Tribune, October 12, 2006.
 "Five Years After 9/11 – A Balance Sheet", NRC Handelsblad, September 6, 2006.
 "Is War With Iran Inevitable?", NRC Handelsblad, April 21, 2006.
 "Still Time for a Good Deal With India", with Michael Levi, Washington Post, March 10, 2006.
 "Face-to-Face: The Recent Spike of Violence in Iraq", Washington Examiner, March 2, 2006.
 "The Limits of Rice's Diplomacy", NRC Handelsblad, January 17, 2006.
 "We Should Strike Iran, But Not With Bombs", with Philip Gordon, Washington Post, January 22, 2006.

Other publications
 "NATO's Victory in Libya- the Right Way to Run an Intervention." Foreign Affairs, March–April 2012.
 "In the Shadow of the Oval Office: The Next National Security Adviser", with I. M. Destler, Foreign Affairs, January/February 2009, pp. 114–29.
 "The Logic of Zero", with Jan Lodal, Foreign Affairs, November/December 2008, pp. 80–95.
 "America and the Use of Force: Sources of Legitimacy", with Robert Kagan, in Chollet, Lindberg and Shorr (eds). Bridging the Foreign Policy Divide, 2008.
 "Restore Trust in America's Leadership", with James M. Lindsay, Democracy: A Journal of Ideas, Fall 2007.
  "Coping with Failure in Iraq", Vrij Nederland, June 16, 2007.
 (With James M. Lindsay) "Democracies of the World, Unite: The Debate Continues", The American Interest, Vol. II, No. 4 (March/April 2007), pp. 137–139
 "Democracies of the World, Unite", with James M. Lindsay, The American Interest, January/February 2007.
 "Renewing the Nuclear Bargain", with Michael H. Fuchs and Morton H. Halperin, in Halperin, Laurenti, Rundlet and Boyer (eds) Power and Superpower: Global Leadership and Exceptionalism in the 21st Century, 2007.
 "Global NATO", with James Goldgeier, Foreign Affairs, September/October 2006, pp. 105–113.

References

External links
 

 Ivo H. Daalder Bio at The Chicago Council on Global Affairs
 Ambassador Daalder's biography on home page of U.S. Mission to NATO (through Wayback Machine; archived May 10, 2013)
 Dr. Daalder bio at The Brookings Institution.
 Ivo H. Daalder Bio at John Podesta's Center for American Progress
 Zinni discusses with Daalder his book, Before the First Shots are Fired: How America Can Win or Lose Off the Battlefield at the Pritzker Military Museum & Library on September 25, 2014

1960 births
Alumni of the University of Kent
American civil servants
American political scientists
Clinton administration personnel
Dutch emigrants to the United States
Georgetown University alumni
Harvard Fellows
American international relations scholars
Dutch international relations scholars
Jewish American government officials
Jewish Dutch politicians
Jewish Dutch writers
Living people
MIT School of Humanities, Arts, and Social Sciences alumni
Obama administration personnel
People from Chicago
Permanent Representatives of the United States to NATO
Political science educators
Political science writers
Brookings Institution people